Château de Lalande (also written de la Lande) is a 16th-century château near Crozon-sur-Vauvre, Indre, in the Centre-Val de Loire region of France. It was in the historic province of Berry until 1790.

History

The current château was built in the 16th century, by the side of the lake. The east wing with its huge square towers, defences and semi-circular tower, dates from this period.

The château was once owned by Anne Marie Louise d'Orléans, Duchess of Montpensier, a cousin of Louis XIV known as "La Grande Mademoiselle".

The château has a separate private chapel dedicated to Saint Joseph, built in 1866.

In the mid-19th century, it was visited by the French novelist George Sand, who described the area as "la vallée noire" (the black valley).

It later became the hereditary property of the Marquises de Nadaillac. François-Louis du Pouget de Nadaillac escorted Marie Antoinette to France in 1770. The current owners bought Lalande from the de Nadaillac family in 2005.

Location 

The "Chêne du Not", a historic massive oak tree, is found nearby.

In popular culture 
Lalande is featured in the UK reality television series Escape to the Chateau: DIY on Channel 4 and the French television series Bienvenue chez nous (Welcome to our house) on TF1. Lalande is the subject of the YouTube series The Chateau Diaries.

See also
 Château de Nadaillac-de-Rouge

References

Further reading

External links
 
 Instagram page

Houses in France
Buildings and structures in Indre
Châteaux in Indre
Castles in Centre-Val de Loire
Houses completed in the 16th century